Schistura macrolepis is a species of ray-finned fish, a stone loach in the genus Schistura from Pakistan.

References

M
Fish described in 1981
Taxa named by Petre Mihai Bănărescu